Bharetta is a genus of moths in the family Lasiocampidae. The genus was erected by Moore in 1866.

Selected species
Bharetta bidens Zerny, 1928
Bharetta cinnamomea Moore, 1866
Bharetta flammans Hampson, 1892
Bharetta owadai Kishida, 1986

External links

Lasiocampidae